Sainte-Béatrix is a municipality in the Lanaudière region of Quebec, Canada, part of the Matawinie Regional County Municipality.

History
In 1736, Lord Jean d'Ailleboust d'Argenteuil receives a lordship that will bear his name. It won't be until 1864 that the municipality of Sainte-Béatrix be officially created by splitting away from the municipality of Sainte-Mélanie. Louise-Amélie Panet and her husband William Bent Berczy are considered to be the founders of Sainte-Béatrix.

Demographics

Population

Private dwellings occupied by usual residents: 1041 (total dwellings: 1300)

Language
Mother tongue:
 English as first language: 2.3%
 French as first language: 95.1%
 English and French as first language: 0.9%
 Other as first language: 1.4%

Education

Commission scolaire des Samares operates francophone public schools, including:
 École Panet

The Sir Wilfrid Laurier School Board operates anglophone public schools, including:
 Joliette Elementary School in Saint-Charles-Borromée
 Joliette High School in Joliette

Notable people

Canadian artist Céline Boucher was born in Sainte-Béatrix.

See also
List of municipalities in Quebec

References

Incorporated places in Lanaudière
Municipalities in Quebec
Matawinie Regional County Municipality